Nehemiah Katusiime is an Ugandan consultant obstetrician and gynecologist in the Uganda Ministry of Health. He is the executive director of Kawempe General Hospital, in Kawempe Division, in northern Kampala, the capital and largest of Uganda. He was appointed to that position on 9 August 2018.

Background and education
He was born in the Western Region of Uganda. After attending local schools, he was admitted to Makerere University to study human medicine, graduating with a Bachelor of Medicine and Bachelor of Surgery (MBChB) degree. He followed that with a Master of Medicine (MMed) degree in Obstetrics and Gynecology, also from Makerere University.

Career
Dr. Nehemiah Katusiime is a consultant, who was attached to Mulago National Referral Hospital, Uganda's top and largest tertiary referral hospital, with a 1790 bed capacity, which also serves as the teaching hospital of Makerere University College of Health Sciences. Mulago National Referral Hospital is reported to have the busiest labor ward in the world, with over 30,000 live births annually, averaging 32,654 annually in the three years from 1 January 2011 until 31 December 2013. This is an average of approximately 90 deliveries every day, or 3.7 births per hour, including about 20 to 25 daily Caesarean sections.

In 2016, New Mulago Hospital transferred the gynecology ward and delivery suites (labour ward) to the newly-completed Kawempe General Hospital, to allow for the renovation and upgrade to the New Mulago Complex.

In August 2018, Nehemiah Katusiime, MBChB, MMed (Obstetrics and Gynecology), was appointed executive director of Kawempe General Hospital, a 200-bed facility, affiliated with Mulago Hospital. He will be deputized by Dr. Lawrence Kazibwe.

See also
 Kiruddu General Hospital
 Mulago National Referral Hospital
 Makerere University College of Health Sciences

References

External links
Website of Uganda Ministry of Health

Living people
Year of birth missing (living people)
Ugandan obstetricians
Ugandan gynecologists
Makerere University alumni
Academic staff of Makerere University
People from Western Region, Uganda
Ugandan healthcare managers